Nenjamundu Nermaiyundu Odu Raja is a 2019 Indian Tamil-language comedy drama film written and directed by Karthik Venugopalan in his directorial debut. The film stars Rio Raj in his lead acting debut, Shirin Kanchwala, and RJ Vigneshkanth in the supportive roles, while Nanjil Sampath, Vivek Prasanna, Radha Ravi, and Mayilsamy play supportive roles. The film is produced by actor Sivakarthikeyan under his production banner Sivakarthikeyan Productions. Singaporean composer Shabir was roped into score music for the film.

Plot
The film starts with Shiva (Rio Raj) and Vicky (RJ Vigneshkanth) getting a lift in a car because their bike broke down earlier when they were going to a place. Then, they think about their past life. A few months ago, Shiva and Vicky along with their childhood brother Ram (Chutti Aravind) are living in a house for rent. Ram has some respect for his house owner (Mayilsamy), but the other two don't.

Then, the film tells that Shiva and Vicky both have a YouTube channel called "Nenjamundu Nermaiyundu". One day, they go to a mall and do a prank as part of their YouTube videos. They both keep knives on the neck of a big businessman named "Jeepakaran" (Radha Ravi) and a press reporter named "Nisha" (Shirin Kanchwala). Jeepakaran realises that the two men are doing a prank and openly tells them so. Angered by this, Nisha slaps Shiva. Then, Jeepakaran calls Shiva and Vicky and ask them the reason for doing these pranks, to which they say that it's for earning money. The next day, Shiva, Vicky, and Ram help two beggars in Marina Beach, and Nisha sees this. She and Shiva both fall in love with each other but they don't reveal it to the other. Hence they both remain unaware the other's love.

The same day, Shiva and Vicky realize that Jeepakaran's PA ("Put Chutney" Rajmohan) is following them. Shiva and Vicky are assigned to do three tasks by Jeepakaran: be part of a breaking news, elect a mentally-challenged guy as an MLA, and stop a murder in a railway station. They successfully complete the first two tasks and want to know the reason behind the third. Here, Jeepakaran unfolds his flashback. His son Anbu ("Idhu Adhu Illa" Ayaz) had wished to be a reporter, but his father wanted him to take over his business.  Uninterested Anbu joined a TV channel. One day, he overhears a plan of a murder and plans to stop it. Unfortunately, he fails in the attempt because the people had not helped him, resulting in him getting killed.

Angered by this, Jeepakaran decides to elect a mentally challenged man as an MLA and fulfill his son's wish by using Shiva and Vicky. They successfully complete the third task and save the girl from the plan of murder.

Cast

Production 
The film cast consists mainly of YouTube personalities (YouTubers) from a YouTube channel called Black Sheep including the director, VJ turned-lead actor Rio Raj and RJ-turned comedian RJ Vigneshkanth. It also includes many YouTube personalities. The film was announced by debutant director Karthik Venugopal and chose his close YouTube mates Rio Raj and RJ Vigneshkanth to play the pivotal roles in the film. Actor Sivakarthikeyan willingly came forward to help the filmmakers as producer, marking his second production venture after the critically acclaimed Kanaa. It was revealed that the producer initially set a tentative title as Nenjamundu Nermaiyundu and it was later modified as Nenjamundu Nermaiyundu Odu Raja. The film title is also apparently taken from a 1970 film, En Annan which starred veteran actor-politician MGR in the lead role.

Soundtrack 
The soundtrack was composed by Shabir.

References 

2010s Tamil-language films
Indian comedy-drama films
2019 comedy-drama films
Films shot in Chennai
2019 films